Brim may refer to:

People 
Elizabeth Brim, contemporary American blacksmith
Emperor Brim (died 1733), a Muscogee mico war chief
 (1935−1999), Soviet/Azerbaijani educator
John Brim (1922–2003), American Chicago blues guitarist, songwriter and singer
Mike Brim (1966–2005), an NFL football player
Orville Gilbert Brim Jr. (c. 1923–2016), American psychologist
Steelo Brim (born 1988), American television personality
Brim Fuentes, American graffiti artist

Places
Brim, Victoria, a town in Australia
Brim Fell, a fell in the English Lake District
Brim River, a river in British Columbia, Canada

Other uses 
Brim (hat), projection of stiff material from the bottom of a hat's crown
Bream or brim, several species of freshwater and marine
Undercurrent (2010 film), an award-winning 2010 Icelandic film
A former brand of decaffeinated coffee; see Maxwell House; since re-introduced as a low-acid traditional coffee
Brim hf., Icelandic fishing and fish processing company

See also
Brims (disambiguation)
Brimer (disambiguation)
Brimmer, a surname